The Turkish records in swimming are ratified by Turkey's national swimming federation: Türkiye Yüzme Federasyonu (TYF).

Long course (50 m)

Men

Women

Mixed relay

Short course (25 m)

Men

Women

Mixed relay

Notes

References
General
Turkish Swimming Records 29 December 2022 updated
Specific

External links
TYF web site

Turkey
Records
Swimming records
Turkish records